Mable Elmore is a Canadian politician that represents the Vancouver-Kensington electoral district in the Legislative Assembly of British Columbia. A member of the British Columbia New Democratic Party (BC NDP), she was first elected as a Member of the Legislative Assembly (MLA)  in the 2009 provincial election. Currently the Parliamentary Secretary for Anti-Racism Initiatives, she previously served as the Parliamentary Secretary for Poverty Reduction (2017-2020) and Parliamentary Secretary for Seniors Services and Long Term Care (2020-2022).

Prior to becoming the first MLA of Filipino descent, Elmore worked in Vancouver driving buses for the Coast Mountain Bus Company. She was active within Vancouver's Filipino Canadian community and within her union. Coming out of the University of British Columbia she volunteered and then worked at the BC Philippine Women Centre. Since her high school years, she had helped organize campaigns regarding social justice issues and the peace movement.

Elmore was a candidate for the New Democratic Party nomination in Vancouver East for the 2015 federal election, though Jenny Kwan won and went on to become the riding's Member of Parliament.

Background
Elmore's mother immigrated to Canada from the Philippines in 1965 and met her father, an Irish Canadian manager at a pulp and paper mill, while in Prince Rupert, British Columbia. A couple of years later Mable was born in Langley. The family moved to Nova Scotia and they lived in Turkey for a brief time, but they spent most of Elmore's youth living in Manitoba. It was at her high school in Winnipeg, learning about South African apartheid, that she became politically aware and active. Following high school, she attended  the University of British Columbia studying physical education and volunteered at the BC Philippine Women Centre, which turned into a full-time job. Several years later, Elmore started working as a bus driver for the Coast Mountain Bus Company. She was a vocal advocate for social justice issues and worker rights. She was active with the Vancouver and District Labour Council, the BC Federation of Labour, and in her union, the CAW Local 111. She helped organize peace and anti-war marches in Vancouver.

Politics
With the 2009 provincial election approaching, and incumbent New Democratic MLA David Chudnovsky retiring, Elmore put her name forward as a candidate for the NDP nomination in the Vancouver-Kensington riding. Due an internal BC NDP rule requiring that the subsequent NDP candidate be female in ridings where there is a retiring male NDP MLA, only women could be nominated. Elmore's only challenger was former BC Teachers' Federation president Jinny Sims, whom Elmore defeated in the March 2009 nomination election. Within hours of her nomination, copies of a 2004 interview with Elmore published in an online magazine, called Seven Oaks, were distributed in which, in reference to her anti-war activism within a union environment, Elmore identified "vocal Zionists in our worksites" as a challenge. This was viewed as a disparaging remark and party leader Carole James asked Elmore to make a public apology.

The general election was held in May when Elmore ran against realtor and former radio host Syrus Lee for the BC Liberal Party and engineer Doug Warkentin for the BC Green Party. Elmore had the support of many in the Filipino Canadian community who helped campaign for her. Elmore's campaign manager helped thwart an attempt to circumvent election laws by the Kash Heed campaign, a BC Liberal candidate in a neighbouring riding, after she was informed of Heed's intent to mail, in the Vancouver-Kensington riding, anti-NDP pamphlets, which did not include the proper disclosure and documentation. Regardless, Elmore went on to win the general election with 53% of the vote, though her party lost to the BC Liberals who formed a majority government with the NDP as the official opposition. Elmore was the first Filipino Canadian to be elected as a Member of the BC Legislative Assembly, and only the second (after Jenn McGinn) openly lesbian member.

As the 39th Parliament began, Elmore was assigned the role of deputy critic on the Ministry of Children and Family Development, with fellow NDP MLA Maurine Karagianis as the full-time critic. In this role, Elmore identified financial misstatements by Solicitor-General Kash Heed which forced Heed and the Premier to reverse a planned $440,000 cut to domestic violence programs. She was appointed to the Select Standing Committee on Children and Youth in all four sessions of the Parliament. She also serves as the Vice-Chair of the Select Standing Committee on Finance and Government Services in the third and fourth session. Elmore was part of an effort to defend party leader Carole James in 2010 when MLAs began to criticize the party leadership. Following James' resignation as leader, interim leader Dawn Black re-assigned Elmore to be the opposition's multiculturalism critic,  and in the April 2011 leadership election Elmore endorsed Adrian Dix. In July 2012, Dix re-assigned her to be the Critic for the Insurance Corporation of British Columbia (ICBC) and Deputy Critic for Finance.

In the 2013 provincial election Elmore was challenged by Philippines-born Gabby Kalaw for the BC Liberals, research scientist Chris Fjell for the BC Greens, and realtor Raj Gupta for the BC Conservatives, but won with over 50% of the vote. With her party forming the Official Opposition in the 40th Parliament, she retained her critic roles focusing on ICBC and finance, even after John Horgan became party leader in the May 2014 leadership election. She was a vocal critic of the abuse of the temporary foreign worker program. In January 2017, Horgan re-assigned her critic roles to formally focus on temporary foreign workers and immigration while keeping her as deputy critic on finance.

Following the announcement that Libby Davies would not seek re-election as the Member of Parliament in the 2015 federal election, the 45 year old Elmore sought the New Democratic Party nomination in Vancouver East. She was challenged by fellow MLA Jenny Kwan and in the nomination contest on March 22, 2015, Kwan was selected.

Elmore sought re-election in Vancouver-Kensington during the 2017 provincial election, in which she faced former senior advisor for the BC Ministry of Health Kim Chan Logan for the BC Liberals and Simon Rear for the BC Greens.
 She won her riding with over 50% of the vote but her party began the 41st Parliament as the official opposition to a BC Liberal minority government. After the BC Liberals lost a confidence vote and the BC NDP formed the minority government, the new Premier, John Horgan, appointed Elmore to be the position of parliamentary secretary for poverty reduction under Social Development Minister Shane Simpson, as well as the deputy government caucus chairperson. She co-chaired an advisory committee on poverty reduction tasked with 
offering expertise and advice on how best to implement a Poverty Reduction Strategy and recommending priority actions and principles for that strategy.

After winning re-election in 2020, Elmore was re-assigned Parliamentary Secretary for Seniors Services and Long Term Care. She remained in that post until December 7, 2022, when she was named Parliamentary Secretary for Anti-Racism Initiatives by Premier David Eby.

Electoral history

References

External links

 Legislative Assembly of British Columbia - Mable Elmore
 Member of the Legislative Assembly - Mable Elmore (Vancouver-Kensington)
 British Columbia New Democratic Party - Mable Elmore

British Columbia New Democratic Party MLAs
Bus drivers
Canadian LGBT people in provincial and territorial legislatures
Canadian politicians of Filipino descent
Canadian people of Irish descent
Canadian trade unionists
Lesbian politicians
Living people
People from Langley, British Columbia (city)
Politicians from Vancouver
University of British Columbia alumni
Women MLAs in British Columbia
Year of birth missing (living people)
21st-century Canadian politicians
21st-century Canadian women politicians
Lesbian trade unionists
21st-century Canadian LGBT people